National Baptist Memorial Church is a Baptist church in Washington, D.C. It is located at the intersection of 16th Street NW and Columbia Road, where the Mt. Pleasant, Columbia Heights and Adams Morgan neighborhoods meet.  The crossroads is notable for the triple steeples of National Baptist Memorial Church, All Souls Unitarian Church and the Unification Church's cathedral (formerly the Mormon's Washington Chapel).

It is affiliated with the American Baptist Churches USA, the Progressive National Baptist Convention, and to a certain extent the Southern Baptist Convention. Rev. Kasey D. Jones became the senior pastor in 2006 and served until 2017. She was the first woman and the first African-American to serve in that role. Rev. Dr. Charles E. Collins, Jr. served as the interim pastor from September 3, 2017 to February 27, 2022.

History 

For many years there had been discussion at meetings of the Columbia Association of Baptist Churches of organizing a Bible School at the Mount Pleasant Field. At an association meeting held at Calvary Baptist Church in 1901 Percy S. Foster offered his house at the corner of Columbia Road and 13th Street NW for a Sunday school and meeting place during his 1902–1903 term as Association moderator.

Metropolitan Baptist Church maintained a mission Sunday School at Scheutzen Park (earlier spelled Schutzen). Scheutzen Park fronted 7th Street NW (today's Georgia Avenue), between Harvard and Kenyon Streets. Metropolitan Baptist member Mrs. Rosella E. Bryant suggested that the location was too far for the children of 14th Street and that a new Sunday school should be organized there. At the suggestion of Captain Fred Beall, Charles Warner began investigation what could be done to organize a Sunday school at 14th Street.

The first meeting was held at the Post Office hall on Sunday, 7 January 1906.

Immanuel Baptist Church 

By January 1907 the congregation had outgrown Post Office Hall. A lot at the corner of 16th Street NW and Columbia Road NW was purchased in 1907 for $30,000. The property included a house that was renovated to include a hall for services. Late that year financial secretary J. H. W. Marriott got the idea to erect a large, electrically illuminated billboard on the roof of the house (pictured left). The board made a plan to build a church building for $100,000 and a school for $40,000. Architect George W. Stone, Sr. of Stone & Averill was commissioned to design the building to serve as Sunday school house. Stone produced a Neo-Gothic design.

National Baptist Memorial Church 

A movement for the creation of a national Baptist memorial in Washington, D.C. began in 1917. The original concept was as a memorial to Roger Williams and religious freedom. The design was to included a prominently placed statue of Williams (see illustration). In 1919 both the Northern and Southern Baptist Conventions agreed to add $175,000 each for the memorial in their five-year plans. The Washington area was to contribute another $100,000, with Immanuel Baptist Church pledging to raise $50,000 of the Washington contribution from within the church.

The Southern Baptist Convention 1920 Annual Meeting was held 12–17 May in Washington, D.C. and the sight was dedicated Saturday, 15 May of the Convention. Two thousand people attended the dedication. Speakers included Secretary of the Navy Josephus Daniels, Rev. James Bruton Gambrell, President of the Southern Baptist Convention and William Joseph McGlothlin, President of Furman University.

The groundbreaking ceremony was held 23 April 1921. Rev. Johnson opened the ceremony and introduced Rev. E. B. Jackson, pastor of the First Baptist Church of Alexandria, Virginia, who was the chairman of the national building committee of Northern and Southern Baptists.  They sang three stanzas of "America".  A prayer was offered by Rev. J. J. Muir, chaplain of the House of Representatives. Then President Harding broke ground. Gove Griffith Johnson, Jr., the eight-year-old son of Rev. Gove Griffith Johnson pulled the wagon that received the scoop of the first ground (see image to the right). The ceremony was attended by four lineal descendants of Roger Williams.

The Society of Architectural Historians Archipedia speculates that Swartwout's design may have been inspired by All Souls Church, Langham Place, London (1824).

The education building on 15th Street was built in 1941. The entire complex was renovated in 1950.

It was added to the D.C. Inventory of Historic Sites on 8 November 1964 and is part of the Meridian Hill Historic District which was created in April–May 2014.

References 
Citations

Bibliography

External links 

 Historic Photos of the 1921 Groundbreaking for Columbia Heights National Baptist Memorial Church
 Historic 1922 Photo of National Baptist Memorial Church’s Corner Stone Ceremony

Buildings and structures in Washington, D.C.
Churches in Washington, D.C.
Baptist churches in Washington, D.C.
Christian organizations established in 1906
1906 establishments in Washington, D.C.